Schlierbach is a municipality in the district of Göppingen in Baden-Württemberg, Germany.

History
Schlierbach was a possession of the Duchy of Teck, whose territories were inherited by the County of Württemberg in 1381. Schlierbach fully came under Württemberg's control in 1439 with the purchase of all rights over the township. From 1485 on, it was assigned to the administrative district of Göppingen. Schlierbach grew substantially after World War II, especially by the end of the 1960s.

Geography
The municipality (Gemeinde) of Schlierbach lies at the western edge of the district of Göppingen, along its border with the district of Esslingen am Neckar. Elevation above sea level in the municipal area ranges from a high of  Normalnull (NN) to a low of  NN.

Politics
Schlierbach was a single borough, Schlierbach. There two abandoned villages located in its municipal area: Bolzhausen and Brühlmannshof.

Coat of arms
Schlierbach's coat of arms displays a field of blue crossed by two yellow, wavy lines. The yellow lines are references to a local stream, the Schlierbach, and its tributaries, while the stag antler is a reference to Württemberg. This coat of arms was first awarded to Schlierbach by the post-World War II provisional Württemberg-Baden government on 21 January 1948 and was reapproved, and a municipal flag issued, by the Federal Ministry of the Interior on 18 December 1958.

Transportation

References

External links

  (in German)

Towns in Baden-Württemberg
Göppingen (district)